In Lambeth may refer to:
 In Lambeth (album), a 2014 album composed by John Zorn and performed by Bill Frisell, Carol Emanuel and Kenny Wollesen 
 In Lambeth (play), a 1989 play by Jack Shepherd